League table for teams participating in Ykkönen, the second tier of the Finnish Soccer League system, in 1986.

League table

Promotion/relegation playoff

KontU Helsinki - KePS Kemi  3-4
KePS Kemi - KontU Helsinki  3-2

KePS Kemi stayed in Premier Division.

See also
Mestaruussarja (Tier 1)

References

Ykkönen seasons
2
Fin
Fin